Brad Evans is a British academic, and Professor of Political Violence at the department of Politics, Languages & International Studies at the University of Bath, United Kingdom.

Academic Work 
Evans holds two master's degrees from the University of Leeds, in development economics and international relations. His PhD, titled "War for the Politics of Life", dealt with forms of resistance to liberal regimes of power, during which he spent visiting the Zapatista communities of Chiapas, Mexico.

Evans was previously Senior Lecturer of International Relations at the School of Sociology, Politics and International Studies at the University of Bristol. He has been a visiting fellow at the Committee on Global Thought at Columbia University, New York (2013–14) and distinguished society fellow at Dartmouth College, New Hampshire (2017).

Evans' writing presents political, philosophical and aesthetic perspectives on violence.

Media Profile 
In 2011, Evans founded the Histories of Violence project which sought to explore 'the theoretical, aesthetic and empirical dimensions to violence'. As part of this project, Evans co-directed a documentary, Ten Years of Terror, with Simon Critchley. This was screened at 11am at the Solomon K. Guggenheim on the 9, 12, and 13 September 2011.

As a further extension of the Histories of Violence Project, from 15 December 2015 to 23 February 2017, Evans hosted a series of conversations on violence for the opinion section of the New York Times, co-authoring ten pieces with thinkers such as Simon Critchley, Bracha Ettinger, Zygmunt Bauman, Richard Bernstein and Simona Forti. This series was continued at the Los Angeles Review of Books, where Evans has co-authored articles with various artists and thinkers including Oliver Stone, Russell Brand, John Akomfrah, Elaine Scarry, Malcolm London, Jake Chapman, and Marina Abramovic.

As a guest-editor at the Los Angeles Review of Books, in 2015 Evans curated a collection of essays dedicated to the commemoration of the death of the French philosopher Gilles Deleuze. In 2020, he curated a collection of short essays by various thinkers and artists in self-isolation titled "The Quarantine Files. Following this, in September 2021 he curated a collection of essays to commemorate the 20th anniversary of 9/11.

Evans has also authored or co-authored six articles in other major broadsheet papers: twice for the Independent and Newsweek, and once each for The Guardian, the Times and the Times Higher Education. Evans is an occasional guest on Russell Brand's podcast series, Under the Skin. His 2013 book Liberal Terror was the focus for the inaugural episode of the podcast. Subsequent appearances have focused on his ongoing concern with violence, technology and art, including a discussion about his book Ecce Humanitas: Beholding the Pain of Humanity, in which he explained why technology was becoming a new religion.

Works
As of June 2022, Evans' published academic work encompasses three single-authored books, two co-authored books, two single edited volumes and four co-edited volumes. He has co-edited five journal special issues, and produced ten single-authored peer-reviewed journal papers, sixteen co-authored journal papers, ten single-authored book chapters, nine co-authored book chapters,. He has also co-authored a graphic novel.

Single-authored Academic Books
 Ecce Humanitas: Beholding the Pain of Humanity (New York, Columbia University Press: 2021)
Liberal Terror (Cambridge, Polity Press: 2013)
Co-authored Academic Books
 Disposable Futures: The Seduction of Violence in the Age of the Spectacle (San Francisco, City Lights: 2015) (with Henry A. Giroux)
 Resilient Life: The Art of Living Dangerously (Cambridge, Polity Press: 2014) (with Julian Reid)
Co-edited Academic Books
 When the Towers Fell: Commemorating the 20th Anniversary of 9/11 (Los Angeles, LA Review of Books Press: 2022)
 Conversations on Violence: An Anthology (London, Pluto Press: 2021) (Co-edited with Adrian Parr) 
The Quarantine Files: Thinkers in Self-Isolation (Los Angeles, LA Review of Books Press: 2020)
Violence: Humans in Dark Times (San Francisco, City Lights: 2018) (Co-edited with Natasha Lennard)
Histories of Violence: An Introduction to Post War Critical Thought (London, Zed Books: 2017) (Co-edited with Terrell Carver)
Deleuze & Fascism: Security, War & Aesthetics (London, Routledge: 2013) (Co-edited with Julian Reid)
Single-authored Non-Academic Books

 The Atrocity Exhibition: Life in an Age of Total Violence (Los Angeles, LA Review of Books Press: 2019)

Co-authored Graphic Novels

 Portraits of Violence: An Illustrated History of Radical Thinking (London, New Internationalist: 2016) (with Sean Michael Wilson)

References 

1974 births
Living people
Academics of the University of Leeds
Alumni of the University of Bath
People from Rhondda
Welsh male non-fiction writers
Welsh philosophers